Dundlod Mukundgarh railway station is a railway station in Jhunjhunu district, Rajasthan. Its code is DOB. It serves Dundlod and Mukundgarh town. The station consists of 2 platforms. Passenger, Express trains halt here.

Trains

The following trains halt at Dundlod Mukundgarh railway station in both directions:

 Delhi Sarai Rohilla–Sikar Express
 Sikar–Delhi Sarai Rohilla Intercity Express

References

Railway stations in Jhunjhunu district
Jaipur railway division